Guillaume may refer to:

People
 Guillaume (given name), the French equivalent of William
 Guillaume (surname)

Other uses
 Guillaume (crater)

See also
 Chanson de Guillaume, an 11th or 12th century poem
 Guillaume affair, a Cold War espionage scandal that led to the resignation of West German Chancellor Willi Brandt
 Saint-Guillaume (disambiguation)
 Guillaumes, a French commune